The 1944 Colorado gubernatorial election was held on November 7, 1944. Incumbent Republican John Charles Vivian defeated Democratic nominee Roy Phelix Best with 52.40% of the vote.

Primary elections
Primary elections were held on September 12, 1944.

Democratic primary

Candidates
Roy Phelix Best, Colorado State Penitentiary Warden

Results

Republican primary

Candidates
John Charles Vivian, incumbent Governor

Results

General election

Candidates
John Charles Vivian, Republican
Roy Phelix Best, Democratic

Results

References

1944
Colorado
Gubernatorial